Grand Ayatollah Sheikh Isa Ahmed Qassim (Arabic: آية الله الشيخ عيسى أحمد قاسم) is Bahrain's leading Shia cleric and a politician. He is the spiritual leader of Al Wefaq, Bahrain's biggest opposition society. He is the founder and leader of the Islamic Enlightenment Institution.

Biography
Isa Qassim was born in 1937 to a fisherman in Duraz though some sources reported he was born either in 1940 or 1941. He attended Budaiya primary school where he was known for his intelligence and it was reported that he always scored the highest marks. After finishing primary school and with his brother's aid he moved to Manama's secondary school. After graduating he worked as a teacher in Budaiya primary school where he remained until 1962.

Religious activity

Religious study in 1960s
During his academic study, Isa Qassim went to Noaim at night to study Islamic teachings under sheikh Abdul-Hussain Al-Heli (Died in 1957). In 1962, Qassim began studies at the Najaf Religious Institute in Iraq, where he studied under many Marja's including Mohammad Baqir al-Sadr. He remained in Al-Najaf for 4 years then returned to Bahrain where he worked as a teacher in Al-Khamis intermediate school for 2 years before returning to Al-Najaf. In Al-Najaf, he met with other Shia Bahraini scholars including: Sheikh Abdul Amir al-Jamri, Sheikh Abdulla Al-Guraifi, Sheikh Abdulla Al-Madani and Sheikh Abbas Al-Rayes. All of them were from the same generation and knew each other well even before going to Al-Najaf, due to being partners as students or teachers.

Religious study in 1990s
At the beginning of the 1990s, Isa Qassim traveled to Qum in Iran to continue his religious studies. He studied on the hands of some of the highest-ranking Marjas including: Ayatollah Sayed Mahmood al-Qashimi, Ayatollah Sayed Kadhem al-Haeri and Ayatollah Fadhel al-Lankarani. In March 2001, he finished his studies, gained the title of Ayatollah and returned to Bahrain on March 8, 2001.

Friday sermon
Isa Qassim has been leading Friday sermon in Duraz mosque since his return to Bahrain in 2001. Thousands of worshipers attend this sermon weekly.

Political activity

1970s elections

In 1971, Isa Qassim was chosen by religious leaders to be a candidate for elections while he was still in Iraq. At first he refused and wanted to stay in Iraq to finish his studies and stay away from politics, but just four days before candidates registration was closed, his brother Mahdi traveled to Iraq and brought him back along with his wife and kids. In 1972, he was elected for the Constituent assembly where he had big influence in including parts of the Islamic sharia in the 1973 constitution.

Formation of the religious block
In 1972, a 'religious block' was formed which included Isa Qassim, Sheikh Abdul Amir al-Jamri, Sheikh Abdulla Al-Madani, Sheikh Abbas Al-Rayes, Suleiman Al-Mubarak and Hassan Al-Motawwaj. At first they were nine members, but later three of them joined the 'Independent middle' block. During elections the block adopted a wide program including: supporting the labor's union & demands, forbidding trade of Alcoholic drinks and separating men and women in higher education (like primary, intermediate and secondary schools). They also called for prohibiting male doctors from treating females (especially in pregnancy) as well as other demands that are part of the Islamic customs.

In 1973, Qassim was elected a member of Bahrain's parliament, the National Assembly of Bahrain, until the parliament was dissolved in August 1975. He gained 1079 votes making him the biggest winner in the fifteen constituency.

1996 coup plot allegations
The Bahraini government alleged that Qassim was implicated in a coup plot in 1996. They accused him to be the head of an Iran-based group called Hizbullah Bahrain, who were said to be behind a conspiracy to overthrow the Bahraini government. After tortures, some of those convicted of the conspiracy “confessed to receiving financial help and military training from Iran and Lebanon”. This claim was described by Human Rights Watch as lacking any credibility. Their confessions were broadcast on Bahrain TV. Many Bahraini Shias denied that Isa Qassim was involved in any plot and claimed that the confessions were taken under torture.

Role in Al Wefaq
Isa Qassim is often referred to as the spiritual leader of Al Wefaq. However, he has no formal position within the party and has attained this status as a result of his religious seniority. Some see this as a way for Qassim to avoid “submitting his opinions to internal democratic debate so that he can retain the final decision without paying the price for it”. Qassim rarely makes his decisions in public.

Involvement in the Bahraini uprising (2011–present)
Throughout the Bahraini uprising (2011–present) Qassim has been a vocal critic of the government and has led the opposition to King Hamad bin Isa Al Khalifa. "Bahrain’s Sunni rulers have treated Shiite anti-government protesters seeking greater rights in the Gulf kingdom as enemies of state." He said on September 16 during Friday Sermon. "the politics of fear and the Sunni rulers’ refusal to reform has strengthened the resolve of Bahrain's Shiite majority. He added.

Deployment of Peninsula Shield Force
On 14 March, the Gulf Cooperation Council (GCC) agreed to deploy Peninsula Shield Force troops to Bahrain. Saudi Arabia deployed about 1,000 troops with armored support, and the United Arab Emirates deployed about 500 police officers. The forces crossed into Bahrain via the King Fahd Causeway. The purported reason of the intervention was to secure key installations. The opposition reacted strongly, calling it an "occupation".

In response to the deployment of the GCC troops in Bahrain. Isa Qassim, criticised al-Khalifa's claims that the mobilisation of GCC troops is a broader effort to ensure regional stability, rather than what Qassim considers to be Sunni entrenchment and a veiled challenge to Shia representation in the government. On 18 March he said the Peninsula Shield Force had "made a big mistake" and he "would have been proud" if it instead went "to help our brothers in Gaza".

Loss of nationality
On 20 June 2016, a week after the government of Bahrain suspended the main Shia opposition party al-Wefaq, Isa Qassim was stripped of his Bahraini citizenship. An interior ministry statement accused Sheikh Isa Qassim of “using his position to serve foreign interests" and “promote sectarianism and violence". Announcing the move to strip him of his Bahraini citizenship, the interior ministry said the cleric had "adopted theocracy and stressed the absolute allegiance to the clergy". It added that he had been in continuous contact with "organisations and parties that are enemies of the kingdom". Bahrain's citizenship law allows for the cabinet to revoke the citizenship of anyone who "causes harm to the interests of the kingdom or behaves in a way inimical with the duty of loyalty to it". Due to persecution at the hands of the Sunni regime, in December 2018 he relocated to Iraq.

Reaction 
 After the decision was announced, several hundred Qassim supporters gathered outside his house in the mostly Shia village of Diraz, carrying posters and chanting religious slogans.
 Hussein Abdulla, executive director of campaign group Americans for Human Rights and Democracy in Bahrain, called the move to revoke his citizenship "an unprecedented low for the Bahraini authorities".
 Sayed Alwadaei, director of advocacy at the British-based campaign group Bahrain Institute for Rights and Democracy, said in a statement that the decision would "escalate tensions on the streets and may even lead to violence".
 Saudi Arabia's Council of Senior Scholars (Saudi Arabia) welcomed the actions taken by Bahrain.
 Hezbollah, the Lebanese Shia group, denounced the decision on its Al-Manar TV network, which called on Bahrainis to "express their indignation" and said the move against the cleric would have "grave consequences".
 Ali Larijani, Speaker of the Iranian parliament condemned the action, saying "this was an impolitic and quite an adventurous move by the Bahraini regime which assumed that by revoking the nationality of this prominent spiritual leader, it could lead the country's domestic political crisis toward tranquility" and "the Al-Khalifa regime must take a careful look at this historical record that clearly shows once a government starts threatening the influential figures of its nation with revocation of citizenship, it is taking its last breaths".
 In a statement published by Fars News Agency, Major-General Qassem Soleimani, commander of the Islamic Revolutionary Guard Corps Quds Force said: "The Al Khalifa [rulers of Bahrain] surely know their aggression against Sheikh Isa Qassim is a red line that crossing it would set Bahrain and the whole region on fire, and it would leave no choice for people but to resort to armed resistance."Al Khalifa will definitely pay the price for that and their blood-thirsty regime will be toppled."
 Spokesperson for the United States Department of State John Kirby said, "We are alarmed by the Government of Bahrain's decision to revoke the citizenship of prominent Shia cleric, Sheikh Isa Qassim" and "We remain deeply troubled by the Government of Bahrain's practice of withdrawing the nationality of its citizens arbitrarily, the overall precedent that this case could establish, and the risk that individuals may be rendered stateless".
 Human Rights Watch said the decision to strip the cleric of his citizenship "takes Bahrain into the darkest days" since the 2011 crackdown and "these actions should be met with serious consequences, not expressions of concern".
 The Supreme Leader of Iran, Ali Khamenei, said in a speech carried by state media, "This is blatant foolishness and insanity. When he still could address the Bahraini people, Sheikh Isa Qassim would advise against radical and armed actions" and "Attacking Sheikh Isa Qassim means removing all obstacles blocking heroic Bahraini youths from attacking the regime".

Further persecution
On 16 July 2016, the head of public prosecution, Ahmed al-Dosari, said a Bahraini cleric would go on trial the next month on charges of “collecting funds illegally and money laundering.” Sources identified the cleric as Qassim. Regime controlled media last month reported an investigation was underway into a bank account of some $10 million in Qassim's name to “find the source of the funds and how they were being spent.”

See also
 Abdul Amir al-Jamri
 Al Wefaq National Islamic Society
 Politics of Bahrain
 1990s uprising in Bahrain
 Bahraini uprising (2011–present)

References

External links

 Isa Qassim unofficial Facebook page

1937 births
Living people
Bahraini politicians
People of the Bahraini uprising of 2011
Stateless people
Twelvers
Bahraini Shia Muslims
Bahraini ayatollahs
Islamic Dawa Party